Mohamed Abdelwahab (1 October 1983 – 31 August 2006) was an Egyptian footballer. He played in the defensive left back position. He was an important part of the Egyptian squad that went on to win the 2006 African Cup of Nations. He died during training with his club El Ahly on 31 August 2006.

Early life and career
Abdelwahab was born in the rural town of Faiyum. He began his professional career with Aluminium Nag Hammâdi and whilst there caught the eye of then national youth team coach Hassan Shehata, who included him in his squad. Abdelwahab went on to be part of the Egyptian youth team that won the 2003 African Cup of Nations in Mali.

His excellent form in the World Youth Championship in the United Arab Emirates encouraged UAE side Al Dhafra Club to sign him on a four-year-contract. However, Abdelwahab did not make any appearances at Al Dhafra Club and spent his first year on-loan to ENPPI. Whilst there, he was called up to the Egyptian national team by Italian coach Marco Tardelli. Abdelwahab scored on his debut in the national team's opening 2006 World Cup qualifier against Sudan.

He then joined El Ahly on a two-year loan but failed to secure a starting place in his first season with the club since coach Manuel José depended mainly on Angolan international Gilberto. Abdelwahab's break came in the 2005 African Champions League final against Etoile Sahel of Tunisia when Gilberto left the pitch injured after ten minutes. Abdelwahab was brought on and went on to set up Osama Hosny for El-Ahly's second goal in the 3–0 win that saw the club crowned African champions.

Abdelwahab became a pivotal member of Hassan Shehata's national squad and helped Egypt win the 2006 African Cup of Nations on home soil by scoring the second penalty in the penalty shootout against Ivory Coast. His steady performances helped Al Ahly secure their second consecutive local title, the Egyptian Cup and CAF Super Cup in the same season.

Ahly then moved to land Abdelwahab on a permanent basis from Al Dhafra Club, who turned down the offer. However, a clause in the player's contract with the UAE side allowed him to annul it and sign for Ahly, triggering a tug-of-war between Al Ahly and Al Dhafra and leaving the player inactive for the entire summer, causing him to lose his place in the national side. FIFA had still not determined the outcome of the disagreement when he died on 31 August 2006.

Death
Abdelwahab collapsed during Ahly's morning training session on 31 August 2006. He was rushed to 'Egypt International Hospital' in Dokki, Cairo, but the 22-year-old winger died before he could be revived. According to Egyptian doctors, the cause of Abdelwhab's death was a heart defect. 
National coach Hassan Shehata and the players traveled to Abdelwahab's hometown, Faiyum, to attend the funeral proceedings. His #3 jersey was retired.

References

External links 

CAF announcement of death

1983 births
2006 deaths
Egyptian footballers
Association football defenders
Egypt international footballers
Al Ahly SC players
Association football players who died while playing
Sport deaths in Egypt
People from Faiyum
Al Dhafra FC players
Al Aluminium SC players
ENPPI SC players
Egyptian Premier League players
Expatriate footballers in the United Arab Emirates
Egyptian expatriate footballers
Egyptian expatriate sportspeople in the United Arab Emirates